Giovanni Lombardi, (born 28 May 1926 in Lugano, Switzerland; died 22 May 2017 in Monte Carlo) was a Swiss engineer specialized in civil works and tunnel construction.

Lombardi was educated at the Institut auf dem Rosenberg and studied civil engineering at university. In late 2006 his company Lombardi Engineering Ltd, a Swiss engineering and design company, was retained to build the Gibraltar Tunnel railway tunnel.

References

1926 births
2017 deaths
People from Lugano
Swiss engineers
Institut auf dem Rosenberg alumni